The  is a Japanese railway line operated by the private railway company Tobu Railway, extending from Tōbu-Dōbutsu-Kōen Station in Saitama to Isesaki Station in Gunma Prefecture. The Isesaki Line can refer to the entire section between Asakusa - Isesaki and Oshiage - Hikifune, but from March 2012, the  section south of Tōbu-Dōbutsu-Kōen was branded as the Tobu Skytree Line in conjunction with the opening of the Tokyo Skytree tower.

Descriptions
Track
single:  −  
double: the rest

Operation

Service patterns
Stops and operated sections are as of 2023, February 15.
Tōbu-Dōbutsu-Kōen − Ōta. Connection with Express. Three per hour, with one between Kuki and Tatebayashi.
Ōta − Isesaki. One per hour per direction, conductorless.
 (SSE)
Between Asakusa and Tōbu-Dōbutsu Kōen, Kuki or Minami-Kurihashi on Nikkō Line.
 (SmE)
Early morning and late night. Down to Tōbu-Dōbutsu-Kōen, Kuki or to Minami-Kurihashi on the Nikkō Line through from Chūō-Rinkan of Tokyu Den-en-toshi Line via Hanzōmon Line. 10 cars.
 (SE)
Between Asakusa and Tōbu-Dōbutsu-Kōen, Tatebayashi or Ōta.
 (Ex)
From morning to night. Down to Tōbu-Dōbutsu-Kōen, Kuki (nearly half to Minami-Kurihashi on the Nikkō Line), through from Chūō-Rinkan on the Tokyu Den-en-toshi Line via Hanzōmon Line. 10 cars.
 <span style=background:brown>(LE)
Stops not shown for now. Charged for seat reservation and rapid service. Some through to Isesaki from Asakusa, sole direct service named . The 70090 Series Services runs through to Ebisu from Kuki, Home liner service named TH Liner.

Stations
O: Stop
For the section between Tōbu-Dōbutsu-Kōen and Asakusa, see Tobu Skytree Line.

Rolling stock

Current
Tobu 200 series
Tobu 500 series
Tobu 10000 series
Tobu 50000 series
Tobu 50050 series
Tobu 70090 series (TH Liner)
Tokyu 2020 series
Tokyu 5000 series
Tokyo Metro 18000 series
Tokyo Metro 8000 series
Tokyo Metro 08 series

Former
Tokyu 8500 series (1975-2023)
Tobu 30000 series

History

In 1931, a bridge over the Sumida River was built and present Asakusa Station (then ) opened as part of the department store building, the entire line being completed.

The Asakusa to Nishiarai section was double-tracked in 1912, and the rest of the line was double-tracked between 1920 and 1927, except for the Hanyu to Kawamata section, which was double-tracked when a second bridge was built over the Tonegawa in 1992.

After World War II, the Tobu Lines had no connection to the Yamanote Line or other major lines of the then Japanese National Railways (JNR) to offer efficient transfers to central Tokyo. The sole connection was with the Jōban Line at Kitasenju, which offered poor access to central Tokyo. To solve the inefficiencies of transfers at Kitasenju and notoriously narrow Asakusa, in 1962, the Hibiya Line of the then , known as TRTA, present Tokyo Metro) was built, connecting at Kitasenju.

Further growing traffic required Tobu to build a second through line to Tokyo Metro Hanzomon Line in the 1990s.

From the 3 March 2006, timetable revision, less than half of trains originated or terminated at Asakusa, with more trains operating through to Tokyo Metro subway lines.

From 17 March 2012, the section south of Tōbu-Dōbutsu-Kōen was rebranded as the Tobu Skytree Line.

References
This article incorporates material from the corresponding article in the Japanese Wikipedia

External links

 Tobu Railway Isesaki Line information page 

 
Isesaki Line
Rail transport in Saitama Prefecture
Rail transport in Gunma Prefecture
Rail transport in Tochigi Prefecture
Railway lines opened in 1899
1067 mm gauge railways in Japan
1899 establishments in Japan
1500 V DC railway electrification